Hidayathul Islam Higher Secondary School also known as H.I.H.S.S is an educational institution located at Edavanakad, a small village at Vypin island at Ernakulam district, Kerala.

Schools in Ernakulam district
High schools and secondary schools in Kerala